Below is a list of ships responsible for bombarding targets at Gold Beach as part of the Normandy landings on 6 June 1944, the opening day of Operation Overlord.
This force, code-named "Bombarding Force K", and commanded by Rear Admiral Frederick Dalrymple-Hamilton of the Royal Navy, was a group of eighteen ships responsible for bombarding targets in support of the amphibious landings on Gold Beach on 6 June 1944 ("D-Day"); this was the opening day of Operation Overlord, the Allied operation that launched the successful invasion of German-occupied western Europe during World War II.

Bombarding Force K was part of Royal Navy Force G, commanded by Commodore Cyril Douglas-Pennant. This was in turn part of the Eastern Naval Task Force, under Admiral Philip Vian.

Citations

Sources
 
 

Lists of ships of the United Kingdom
Gold Bombardment Group
Lists of World War II ships